Let There Be Light (original title: Que la lumière soit !) is a 1998 comedy fantasy film directed by Arthur Joffé, starring an ensemble cast.

Cast

 Hélène de Fougerolles as Jeanne
 Tchéky Karyo as Harper
 Ticky Holgado as Angel René
 Bruce Myers as The Rabbi
 Lorella Cravotta as Rachel
 Gordon Tootoosis as Indian God
 Catherine Jacob as God Suzanne
 Patrick Bouchitey as Pilot God
 Arielle Dombasle as Blond God
 Élie Semoun as Seller God
 Yolande Moreau as Contractual God
 Frédéric Mitterrand as Driver God
 Julien Guiomar as God Father
 François Morel as Gravedigger God
 Sergio Castellitto as Tourist God
 Michel Galabru as Southern God
 Arthur Joffé as Shower & Phone God 
 Patrick Poivre d'Arvor as Journalist God
 José Garcia as The Journalist
 Éric Blanc as Guardian God
 Jacques Weber as Professor Lang
 Rufus as Harper's driver
 Zinedine Soualem as Dustman God
 Michael Lonsdale as Monsignor Loublié
 Justine Johnston as The Old American
 David Labiosa as The Thief
 Dominique Farrugia as The taxi
 Dominique Besnehard as Advertising director
 Patrick Braoudé as Advertising presenter
 André Valardy as The bear trainer
 Maïté as Nurse God
 Marie-Pierre Casey as Mother Michu
 Harry Holtzman as Martin
 Pierre Arditi Invincible God's Voice

References

External links

1998 films
1990s fantasy comedy films
French fantasy comedy films
1990s French-language films
Films directed by Arthur Joffé
1990s French films